Infanta María Teresa was the lead ship of her class of armoured cruiser constructed for the Spanish Navy. The ship fought at the Battle of Santiago de Cuba during the Spanish–American War.

Technical characteristics

Infanta María Teresa was built at Bilbao, northern Spain, to a design drawn up by Palmers Shipbuilding and Iron Company of Jarrow, England. Her keel was laid in 1889, she was launched on 30 August 1890, and was completed in 1893. She had two funnels and was fast and comparatively well-armed. Her main armament was mounted on the centerline in single barbettes fore and aft. Her armor was poor: her  guns had only lightly armored hoods, her  guns were mounted in the open on the upper deck, her armor belt was thin and protected only two-thirds of her length, and she had a high, unprotected freeboard that took much damage during the Battle of Santiago de Cuba. Like other nineteenth-century warships, she was heavily furnished and decorated with wood, which the Spanish failed to remove prior to combat and which would feed fires during the battle. In 1895 she was the flagship of the representative squadron deployed to represent Spain at the opening of the Kiel Canal.

Operational history
Infanta María Teresa was the flagship of Spanish Vice Admiral Pascual Cervera y Topete, commander of the Spanish Navy's 1st Squadron, when tensions with the United States were rising after the explosion and sinking of the US battleship Maine in the harbor at Havana, Cuba on 15 February 1898. The squadron concentrated at São Vicente in Portugal's Cape Verde Islands; departing Cadiz on 8 April 1898. Infanta María Teresa, the armored cruiser , and three destroyers arrived at São Vicente on 14 April 1898, experiencing machinery problems and burning excessive amounts of coal during the voyage. As more ships arrived over the next few days, it was noted that the 140 mm guns aboard Infanta Maria Teresa had defective breech mechanisms and had been supplied with defective ammunition, and that the fleet had a shortage of stokers.

The Spanish–American War broke out while Infanta María Teresa was at São Vicente. Ordered by neutral Portugal in accordance with international law to leave São Vicente within 24 hours of the declaration of war, Infanta María Teresa and the rest of Cervera's squadron departed on 29 April 1898, bound for San Juan, Puerto Rico. The fleet reached French-owned Martinique in the Lesser Antilles on 10 May 1898. While the large ships loitered in international waters, two of the Spanish destroyers went into Fort-de-France to ask for coal. France was neutral and would not supply coal, so the Spanish squadron departed on 12 May 1898 for the Netherlands-owned Curaçao, where Cervera expected to meet a collier. Cervera arrived at Willemstad on 14 May, but the Netherlands also was neutral, and strictly enforced its neutrality by allowing only Infanta María Teresa and her sister ship  to enter port and permitting them to load only 600 tons of coal. Cervera's ships departed on 15 May, no longer bound for San Juan, which by now was under a U.S. Navy blockade, but for as-yet unblockaded Santiago de Cuba on the southeastern coast of Cuba, arriving there on 19 May 1898. Cervera hoped to refit his ships there before he could be trapped. His squadron was still in the harbor of Santiago de Cuba when an American squadron arrived on 27 May 1898 and began a blockade which would drag on for 37 days.

The blockade wore on, with Infanta María Teresa and the others enduring occasional American naval bombardments of the harbor. Infanta María Teresa still faced a serious problem with her 140 mm gun ammunition, 80 percent of which defective. Some of her crewmen joined others from the fleet in a Naval Brigade to fight against a U.S. Army overland drive toward Santiago de Cuba.

By the beginning of July 1898, the US thrust threatened to capture Santiago de Cuba, and Cervera decided that his squadron's only hope was to escape into the open sea by running the blockade. The decision was made on 1 July 1898, with the break-out set for 3 July 1898. The crew of Infanta María Teresa spent 2 July 1898 returning from Naval Brigade service and preparing for action. With Vice Admiral Cervera aboard, Infanta María Teresa was to lead the escape, sacrificing herself by attacking the fastest American ship, armored cruiser , allowing the rest of the squadron to avoid action and run westward for the open sea.

The Spanish ships put seaward at 0845 hrs on 3 July 1898. The US ships sighted the Spanish ships in the channel at about 0935, and the Battle of Santiago de Cuba began. As lead ship in the Spanish line, Infanta María Teresa was the first ship to receive concentrated fire from the blockading U.S. Navy squadron. A general engagement ensued, with the US ships to starboard of Infanta María Teresa and both sides firing at maximum rates.

One of the first shells Iowa fired hit the after main-battery turret of Infanta María Teresa, killing or wounding its crew and knocking out its gun. Infanta María Teresa had already taken many hits, and now Brooklyn and battleship  began to hit her repeatedly. Fires broke out, threatening to detonate her ammunition magazines. Seeing no hope for the ship and wishing to save as many of her crew as possible, Cervera at 1020 hours ordered the ship beached. She turned to starboard and ran aground at 1025 hours a few miles west of Santiago de Cuba and just west of Punta Cabrera. The colors were struck and the magazines were flooded to prevent explosions.

Some of the ship's crewmen made it ashore, although they had to beware of Cuban insurgents, who began to shoot the survivors of the wrecked Spanish ships. Others were rescued by American sailors who brought small boats alongside the wrecks to take off survivors.

After the war, the US Navy refloated Infanta María Teresa in an attempt to put her into service. She was towed to Guantanamo Bay, Cuba, for preliminary repairs, then was towed by repair ship  toward Norfolk, Virginia, where her repairs could be completed. Caught in a storm during the voyage, she began to founder. Repair ship Merritt took off her crew, and Infanta María Teresa sank between two reefs off Cat Island in the Bahamas with a broken back, a total loss.

Memorials
After her sinking several cannons were salvaged by the United States. One of the 140 mm guns  is on display in Groton, Connecticut. Another cannon (with battle damage) is on display at Veterans Memorial Park in Ottumwa, Iowa. The plaque on the cannon reads, "This Cannon was taken from the battleship The Maria Theresa, flag ship of admiral Cervera's fleet in the war with Spain in 1898. Plaque donate by Jo Hayes Camp, Spanish War Veterans of Ottumwa". A third cannon salvaged from the vessel is on prominent display at the Minneapolis Veterans Home (long term care facility) operated by the Minnesota Department of Veterans Affairs.

Notes

References
 Chesneau, Roger, and Eugene M. Kolesnik, Eds. Conway's All The World's Fighting Ships 1860–1905. New York, New York: Mayflower Books Inc., 1979. 
 
 Nofi, Albert A. The Spanish–American War, 1898. Conshohocken, Pennsylvania:Combined Books, Inc., 1996.

External links

 The Spanish–American War Centennial Website: Infanta Maria Teresa
 Department of the Navy: Naval Historical Center: Online Library of Selected Images: Spanish Navy Ships: Infanta Maria Teresa (Armored Cruiser, 1890–1898)

Infanta Maria Teresa-class armored cruisers
Ships built in Spain
1890 ships
Spanish–American War cruisers of Spain
Shipwrecks in the Caribbean Sea
Shipwrecks of the Spanish–American War
Cat Island, Bahamas

fr:Classe Infanta Maria Teresa